Lái Thiêu is a ward of Thuận An town in Bình Dương Province of Southeast region of Vietnam. It is famous for its ceramics and fruits.

Administrative divisions
Lái Thiêu consists of 9 neighborhoods:

 Hòa Long
 Long Thới
 Chợ
 Nguyễn Trãi
 Đông Nhì
 Đông Tư
 Bình Hòa
 Bình Đức 1
 Bình Đức 2

Education
 Nguyen Trai High School
 Nguyen Van Tiet Middle School
 Phu Long Middle School
 Tran Quoc Toan Primary School

History
Before 1975, Lai Thieu used to be a rich land with many features such as tourism to Cau Ngang and Binh Nham fruit gardens, traditional craft villages, lacquer crafts, glass paintings, clogs, crockery, porcelain, etc. lu, khap... Lai Thieu area is now Thuan An area with 11 communes (Tan Thoi, Phu Long, Vinh Phu, Binh Nham, Binh Hoa, Hung Dinh, An Thanh (Bung), An Son, Binh). Chuan, Thuan Giao and An Phu) also known as Lai Thieu most commune. After 1975, Thuan Giao and An Phu areas were planned to be built in the direction of an industrial park where many people from other places come to live and work, so the name Thuan An is a combination of Thuan Giao and An Phu. to replace Lai Thieu.

References

Populated places in Bình Dương province